Kronberg (Taunus) station is a railway station in Kronberg im Taunus, located in the Hochtaunuskreis, Hesse, Germany. It is served by line S4 of the Rhine-Main S-Bahn.

References

Rhine-Main S-Bahn stations
Railway stations in Hesse
Railway stations in Germany opened in 1875
Buildings and structures in Hochtaunuskreis